The Reserve Forces and Militia Act 1898 (61 & 62 Vict. c. 9) was an Act of the Parliament of the United Kingdom, which came into force in 1898.

The Act allowed up to five thousand men of the Army Reserve to be called out on permanent service, without requiring the approval of Parliament as required by the Reserve Forces Act 1882. This power was only applicable to men in the first twelve months of their enlistment in the Reserve who had agreed in writing, and no man was to be liable for more than twelve months service under these provisions. The Act could not be invoked save when the men were required for active service outside the United Kingdom. This section was later amended by the Territorial and Reserve Forces Act 1907 to allow up to 6,000 men to serve, rather than five thousand, with an eligibility period of two years; the Reserve Forces Act 1937 extended the eligibility period to the first five years in the reserves.

It also amended s.12 of the Militia Act 1882, changing the liability for service "outside of the United Kingdom" to refer to the Channel Islands, the Isle of Man, Malta, and Gibraltar.

The Act gained the royal assent on 1 July 1898, and was fully repealed by 1950.

Notes

References

p. 12-13, The Public General Acts passed in the sixty-first and sixty-second years of the reign of Her Majesty Queen Victoria. London: HMSO, 1898.

United Kingdom Acts of Parliament 1898
United Kingdom military law
Repealed United Kingdom Acts of Parliament